James Richard Beresford (born 19 January 1989) is an Australian former professional baseball infielder. He played in Major League Baseball in 2016 for the Minnesota Twins.

Career
Beresford played with the Waverly Baseball Club where he was named as club MVP before being signed with the Twins organization in 2005 at age 16. He debuted for the Victoria Aces in Claxton Shield 2006 replacing Justin Huber after he withdrew. Due to a torn labrum, he missed the 2006 minor league season. In the 2007 Claxton Shield, he averaged .304 for Australian Provincial. He returned to the US in 2007 making his debut and hitting a .288/.349/.302 clip as the starting shortstop for the GCL Twins. He played again in Claxton Shield 2008 and went 2 for 7. In the 2008 minor league season, he batted a .246/.345/.285 clip for the Elizabethton Twins. In 2009, he was named in the final Australia national baseball team for the 2009 World Baseball Classic in March, and was again selected for the 2009 Baseball World Cup in September.

In 2009, he was named Beloit Snappers player of the year.

In 2011, he hit for a .270 average in 485 at bats for the Fort Myers Miracle following a switch to second. He elected free agency on 6 November 2015.

Beresford was promoted to the Major Leagues for September call ups in 2016 and played ten games, hitting .227 for the Twins.

The last professional appearance for Beresford was with the Melbourne Aces 29 January 2017. He played 54 games and hit .307 in the Australian Baseball League between 2011 and 2017.

Personal
His older brother, Simon Beresford, played minor league baseball for the Milwaukee Brewers organization.

References

External links

1989 births
2009 World Baseball Classic players
2013 World Baseball Classic players
2017 World Baseball Classic players
Australian expatriate baseball players in the United States
Beloit Snappers players
Elizabethton Twins players
Fort Myers Miracle players
Gulf Coast Twins players
Living people
Major League Baseball players from Australia
Major League Baseball infielders
Minnesota Twins players
Melbourne Aces players
New Britain Rock Cats players
Rochester Red Wings players
Sportspeople from Melbourne
People from Mount Waverley, Victoria